The Order of Christ, is an order of chivalry continued by King Álvaro I of Kongo in 1607 after the Portuguese brought the Order of Christ to the Kingdom of Kongo. Álvaro I formed and granted knighthoods for the Order of Christ, with the Vatican ruling that Álvaro I and his successors held the fons honorum for the Order of Christ, thus being able to grant the order.

Historically, those who were awarded a knighthood in the Order of Christ historically wore mantles with an embroidered cross. The Order of Christ became a central part of the military life of the Kingdom of Kongo, including many members of the aristocracy. A number of local rulers underwent investiture into the Order of Christ. The Order of Christ continues to be granted by pretenders to the throne of the Kingdom of Kongo.

References 

Awards established in 1607
Kingdom of Kongo